Murder by Experts is a 1936 mystery thriller novel  by the British writer Anthony Gilbert, the pen name of Lucy Beatrice Malleson. It launched her long-running series featuring the shady London lawyer and detective Arthur Crook. Although she had been writing since 1926 this was her first major popular success. The plot revolves around collectors of Chinese antiques.

References

Bibliography
 Magill, Frank Northen . Critical Survey of Mystery and Detective Fiction: Authors, Volume 2. Salem Press, 1988.
 Reilly, John M. Twentieth Century Crime & Mystery Writers. Springer, 2015.

1936 British novels
British mystery novels
British thriller novels
Novels by Anthony Gilbert
Novels set in London
British detective novels
Collins Crime Club books